Spiess Tuning is the common identity of Siegfried Spiess Motorenbau GmbH, a motor vehicle engine company based in Ditzingen, Baden-Württemberg, Germany. 

Siegfried Spiess Motorenbau GmbH is a family-run company that develops, manufactures and services its own high-performance engines in second generation. Currently, three pillars form the Siegfried Spiess Motorenbau GmbH: Spiess RACing, Spiess Classic and Spiess CNC. Spiess RACing is responsible for the development, production and assembly of racing engines. This also includes the on-site support of the teams and drivers. Spiess Classic is mainly concerned with the design and restoration of young and classic car engines. Spiess CNC manufactures complex one-offs and also offers contract manufacturing, both for private individuals and for companies.

The company´s founder Siegfried Spiess 
Siegfried Spiess had direct contact with engines and vehicles since his childhood, as his parents ran an NSU and Mercedes workshop in Stuttgart Weilimdorf. Eventually, he learned and worked as a car mechanic. Later, Siegfried Spiess passed his master craftsman's examination in the motor vehicle craft.

His wife Brigitte gave him two sons, Holger and Jürgen. Holger Spiess is currently one of the managing directors of Siegfried Spiess Motorenbau GmbH, together with Samuel Schleier.

Between 1963 and 1968, Siegfried Spiess won several championship titles on NSU vehicles. In 1963, he became German hillclimb champion on a NSU Prinz, in 1965 on an NSU 1000 TT. After the runner-up title in 1966, he won the Bergmeister title two years in a row in 1967 and 1968 on an NSU Wankelspider. This was followed by the runner-up title again in 1969. At the end of 1969, 'Siggi' Spiess said goodbye to active racing, but still occasionally took part in races until 1975.

Siegfried Spiess tuned NSU engines into excellent power units that were used worldwide with great success. On March 22, 1972, he left his parents' business and founded his trademark: Spiess Tuning. His workshop in Weilimdorf, which, however, quickly became too small, was followed by several locations to meet the increasing demand.

Company history 
On behalf of NSU, Siegfried Spiess not only tuned the engines but also built the entire vehicles. After the last NSU rolled off the production line in 1972 and Willi Bergmeister had won the last of the numerous championship titles with a Spiess-NSU engine in 1974, Siegfried Spiess reoriented himself and focused on the 1.6 litre GTI engine from the Golf/Scirocco series for the first time.

The 1.6-litre GTI engine laid the foundation for the Formula 3 successes. When Helmut Henzler won the German and European championship title in Formula Super V in 1978 with an engine built by Spiess, Spiess mechanics were on site for the first time to service and maintain the engine during all races. The first engine test bench went into operation in the same year.

In 1979, Siegfried Spiess independently developed the first Formula 3 engine on VW basis. In 1983, three teams competed in the German Formula 3 Championship with Spiess-built VW engines, initially without VW factory order. The VW engine, modified by Spiess, proved its worth in Formula 3 right from the start.

In 1983 and 1984, the team finished as runners-up and in 1985, Volker Weidler won the first German Formula 3 title with an engine modified by Spiess.

After the success in 1987 with Bernd Schneider, VW was enthusiastic about the success of the privately organised teams and secured the services of the most successful engine tuner: Spiess. Various title wins followed. One of the title winners was the later seven-time Formula 1 World Champion Michael Schumacher. In 1990, with a VW engine modified by Spiess, he won the German Formula 3 Championship and the Macau Grand Prix, the most important and prestigious Formula 3 race in the world.

After more than 10 years of success with Volkswagen, the era with Opel followed. Between 1992 and 2002, with the exception of 1994, the Opel-Spiess engine dominated Formula 3 in Germany. In Japan, Great Britain, France, Italy, Sweden, Norway, Switzerland, etc., Opel-Spiess engines were used in various racing series and won championships with them. It is worth mentioning that the VW successes also brought Opel onto the scene and that it was an absolute novelty and an extreme sign of confidence that a tuner was responsible for two competing products.

In 1997, a Super Touring Car (STW) engine was produced. In the German STW Championship, Opel won the brand title with Spiess. Spiess engines were also used in the British Touring Car Championship. In 1999, the South African championship followed.

In 2000, Siegfried Spiess GmbH developed and manufactured a 4-litre V8 engine for the Opel Astra V8 Coupé for the German Touring Car Championship. Despite individual victories, Opel only just missed out on the championship title. Since then, Opel and Spiess became an important pillar of the world-appreciated DTM.

In 2001, finished components were delivered to General Motors in the USA.

As the workshop at the former location in Ditzingen became too small, Spiess Tuning moved to a specially designed new building in 2001. In the new 2,400 sqm halls, the four new test benches (three static, one dynamic) formed important elements for the ongoing success in racing. The new location is still the headquarters of Siegfried Spiess GmbH at Dieselstraße 11 in Ditzingen.

Spiess also achieved great successes in the ATS Cup, the German Formula 3 Championship. Until 2008, all championship titles were won by Opel-Spiess for five consecutive years.

In Argentina, 4-cylinder Opel engines modified by Spiess were used in touring cars in 2003.

In addition, in both 2003 and 2004, Ryan Briscoe, Nicolas Lapierre and Nico Rosberg were able to perform confidently with the Opel-Spiess engine in the Formula 3 Euroseries, the world's highest Formula 3 championship at that time.

In 2004, Karl Reindler won first place in the Australian Formula 3 Championship with the Opel-Spiess engine. In the same year, Siegried Spiess GmbH extended its business activities to prototyping and testing of high-performance derivatives.

Spiess pushed the cooperation with VW and entered the Dakar Rally.  In cooperation with VW, the first diesel engine for long-distance rally events was developed and manufactured by Spiess.

In 2006, the team narrowly missed out on victory, which was followed by the Central Europe Rally in 2008. The first Dakar championship title for VW and Spiess followed in 2009 with Giniel de Villiers and Dirk von Zitzewitz at the wheel. In both 2009 and 2010, Spiess and VW achieved the sensational triple win, after which VW decided to end its participation in the Dakar Rally.

Volkswagen returned to the Formula 3 stage in 2007 as an engine supplier. Initial testing in September was followed by continuous racing in 2008 and already the first victory. Spiess Power dominated the ATS Cup for six consecutive years.

In 2014, Tom Blomqvist and Max Verstappen finished second and third in the European Formula 3 Championship with Spiess-VW. Further championships in the European Formula 3 Racing Series followed in 2015, 2017 and 2018.

In 2016, he entered the Superformula Lights in Japan after Formula 3 changed the regulations. In 2017, Mitsunori Takaboshi won the championship there. At the Macau Grand Prix, Dan Ticktum finished first with a VW Spiess engine. In the European Formula 3 Championship, Lando Norris managed to win the championship title.

In 2019, Spiess Motorenbau entered the Euroformula Open. Right away, the championship title was won by Marino Sato. Also in Japan, Sacha Fenestraz won the overall Superformula Lights classification with Spiess Power in the same year.

Helmut Maier has been successfully competing in hillclimb races with an Spiess engine since 1979. As a result, other racers became aware of Spiess. So Spiess decides to officially participate in hillclimb races with Erwin Buck and Spiess SPG01 engine (1,6l) in 2019.

In 2020, the championship title was won in the Euroformula Open with Ye Yifei and Spiess A41 engine. In Japan, Sena Sakaguchi finished second in the Superformula Lights. The Spiess 2.0 l engine for hill climbs was introduced to the market.

In 2021, Erwin Buck became KW-Bergcup winner and vice mountain champion with Spiess SP G02 (2,0l) engine. With Spiess A41 engines, Cameron Das won the Euroformula Open and Teppei Natori the Superformula Lights.

Due to the many diversifications in the last 50 years, the company has created the three Spiess pillars: Spiess CNC, Spiess Classic and Spiess Racing. Here again the exact definition of the three pillars:

Spiess RACing is responsible for the development, production and assembly of racing engines. This also includes the on-site support of the engines at the race tracks.

Spiess Classic is mainly concerned with the construction and restoration of young and classic car engines.

Spiess CNC manufactures complex one-offs and also offers contract manufacturing, both for private individuals and for companies.

In 2022, Siegfried Spiess Motorenbau GmbH celebrates its 50th anniversary.

A selection of successes

Hillclimb

24h Spa Franchorchapms

Formel Super V Germany

Formel Super V Europe

German Formel 3 Championchip

ATS Cup/Recaro Formula-3-Cup

Grand Prix Macau

Formula 3 Grand Prix Monaco

Formula 3 Euroseries

Dakar Rallye

Other Series

European Formula 3 Championship

Euroformula Open

Superformula Lights

Links 
http://www.berg-meisterschaft.de/?page_id=814

Historie - S. Spiess Motorenbau GmbH (spiess-racing.de)

Helmut Henzler | Racing career profile | Driver Database (driverdb.com)

Formel V – Wikipedia

Rallye Dakar – Wikipedia

Macau Grand Prix – Wikipedia

https://www.bing.com/search?q=superformula+lights&cvid=e4d5f3c9971c45afaeb95cfee8814a59&aqs=edge..69i57j0l3.2719j0j4&FORM=ANAB01&PC=U531 

https://www.bing.com/search?q=superformula+lights&cvid=e4d5f3c9971c45afaeb95cfee8814a59&aqs=edge..69i57j0l3.2719j0j4&FORM=ANAB01&PC=U531 

Europäische Formel-3-Meisterschaft – Wikipedia

Formel-3-Euroserie – Wikipedia

https://www.euroformulaopen.net/en/

https://superformula-lights.com/

https://formel3guide.com/

Automotive motorsports and performance companies
Automotive companies of Germany